Paulina is an unincorporated community in Crook County, Oregon, United States. It was named after Paiute Chief Paulina. Paulina post office was established in 1882.
Paulina has one K-8 grade school. The community is the home of the Paulina Rodeo, which was the subject of a Kim Stafford poem, and the Paulina Ranger District of the Ochoco National Forest.

Climate
According to the Köppen Climate Classification system, Paulina has a semi-arid climate, abbreviated "BSk" on climate maps.

References

External links
History of Paulina copied from Oregon Geographic Names at oregoncities.com
Historic photos of Paulina from Salem Public Library

Unincorporated communities in Crook County, Oregon
1882 establishments in Oregon
Populated places established in 1882
Unincorporated communities in Oregon